Zig and Zag may refer to:

Zig and Zag (Australian performers), Jack Perry and Doug McKenzie, a clown duo who appeared on Australian television from 1957 to 1969
Zig and Zag (puppets), Irish puppet duo that made their television début on RTÉ's The Den in 1987
Zig and Zag (TV series), animated TV series featuring the puppets

See also
Zigzag (disambiguation)